Otto Silber (17 March 1893 – 23 December 1940) was an Estonian footballer. He competed in the men's tournament at the 1924 Summer Olympics.

Silber participated in the first official football game between Tallinn clubs JS Meteor and Merkur on the 6 April 1909 (on the Meteor side). A defender, Silber played in the Estonia national football team between 1920 and 1926, captaining Estonia's first international match against Finland in 1920. He was a founder player in the club Tallinna JK from 1921 to 1925, later becoming a board member. He was also a referee.

Silber, a former soldier in the First World War and Estonian War of Independence, was, following the Soviet annexation of his country in 1940, arrested by the NKVD and executed in Saue, Estonia in December 1940 aged 47, although he was alternatively reported to have died in a motor car accident. He is buried in the Defence Forces Cemetery of Tallinn, Estonia.

References

External links
 

1893 births
1940 deaths
Estonian footballers
Estonia international footballers
Olympic footballers of Estonia
Footballers at the 1924 Summer Olympics
Footballers from Tallinn
Association football defenders
Estonian people executed by the Soviet Union